Nun's Green is a small 18th-century plantation house located in Snow Hill, Maryland, US, one of fourteen remaining structures from that era in Worcester County.  It exhibits a characteristic three-part layout, with a main block joined by a lower hyphen to a kitchen block in the rear.

Nun's Green was listed on the National Register of Historic Places in 1979.

References

External links
, including photo in 1997, at Maryland Historical Trust

Houses in Worcester County, Maryland
Houses on the National Register of Historic Places in Maryland
Plantation houses in Maryland
National Register of Historic Places in Worcester County, Maryland